Paryavarana Kavitodyamam (English: Environment Poetry Movement) is a 21st-century Telugu-language environmental literary movement. There are many literary movements in Andhra Pradesh during pre independence period. These movements were mainly on Indian independence and freedom struggle. After independence, it has turned to social issues and disparities time to time. Feminism and Dalit rights were the issues in late 20th century. Now 21st century is the period for Environment Poetry Movement in Telugu literature. This is called Paryavarana Kavitodyamam and it is the need of the hour. This paper explains how Paryavarana Kavitodyamam is bringing new trends in Telugu literature during 2008–2009 with the brief history of earlier literary movements.

Literary Movements in Pre & Post Independence Period
Telugu poetry has such history of more than a millennium. Many numbers of classical poets have enriched the poetry and the literature with their works. The modern poetry has influenced the Telugu poetry up to 1950s. Urbanization, Industrialization, strained relations with the nature and in family, lack of love and unity between human beings etc., have created a fear psychosis and loneliness in the modern man which was unknown to him earlier. Modern poets have reacted to this pathetic condition of man and expressed their feelings in poetry.

Encounters with British rule have generated all kinds of responses – from downright self-deprecation to rabid self-righteousness. Telugu poetry in the twentieth century hinges more or less on these two extreme responses. On the one hand, there are poets who still swear by old classical virtues of artistic finesse, refined idiom and sacred sentiments; on the other, there are poets who sing in coarse colloquial language with overtly irreverent tones.

Twentieth century Telugu poetry one finds a clear divide, almost a running feud, among twentieth century Telugu poets over the issue of what constitutes the right stuff for poetry. The impact of English education and various social reform movements is clearly visible in these lines.

Poetry of Feeling
Later a new school called Bhavakavitvam (poetry of feeling), spearheaded by Rayaprolu Subbarao and Devulapalli Krishna Sastri, held sway for quite a while. With their accent on non-sexual love, the poets of this school tried to parody the erotic and sensuous poetry of their Sanskrit and Telugu predecessors. But very soon this school, for its lack of social and political consciousness, came under fierce attack from the Marxists. The soft imagery of moonlight, jasmine flowers, cool breeze, etc., was soon replaced by the stark and jarring images of violence, excreta and anarchy. Pathabi Rama Reddy, a poet of this raw new sensibility, writes: "Sorry moon. What can I say?/ No one even mistakes you for a lost rupee coin/ Really you are not wanted here."

Progressive & Revolutionary Poetry
From the 1950s onward, it was the progressive poets who ruled the Telugu poetry. The Abhyudaya Rachayitala Sangham (Progressive Writers’ Association) followed by another association, the Virasam (Revolutionary Writers' Movement), along with many local Naxalite and Maoist associations, have dominated the Telugu literary scene. The poet who emerged almost as an icon was Sri Sri who, much like Paash in Panjabi, created a powerful anti-establishment, anti-colonial and anti-capitalist sentiment among the public at the grassroots level. In a poem entitled Myth of Myself, the poet imagines himself to be a Naxalite who transforms himself into a pumpkin after being killed by the police in a false encounter. When the pumpkin is swallowed by a cow, even resting in the intestines of a cow is a luxury: "Aha! Moving about in the belly of the cow/ is like staying in a five-star hotel." The poet as rebel wants to "return through cow's excrement" so that he is ready for another round of armed combat with the power-structures. Sri Sri wants to lend "his voice" to "the roar of the world," offer his "tear" to "the rain of the world."

Revolutionary poets of Andhra Pradesh who continuously feed the Naxalite movement in Andhra Pradesh through their soul-stirring songs. These songs may not have an artistic tone, but written in dialects used by low castes, these songs go well with the masses in the countryside. Most of the songs border on plain political rhetoric and even sloganeering, but perhaps this is what the political and social reality of Andhra-region. Similarly English writings also published in newspapers by the poets and journalists to support the movement.

Feminism & Dalit Movement
Later in 80’s upcoming women and Dalit poets occupied the literary scenario taking the subject of women rights and freedom, Dalit rights etc. The ideology went for till 1990s and even it is continuing. Substantial literature came in Telugu on Feminism & Dalit Movement. Many poets wrote on various issues of women and downtrodden people of the society. Some writers became mad of these subjects and leaving all other social issues. Dalit movement, sthree (women) movement are sporadic movements in Andhra Pradesh literature. They could not influence and their impact is very little and could not produce best literary works.

Mini Poetry Movement
Parallelly mini poetry came into the scene 1980s in the leadership of Dr Raavi Ranga Rao. Mini poetry went for a decade as a poetry movement. The main idea of this is to write poetry in short form to make the reader to understand easily. The main objective of mini-poetry is to convey the message sharply in few words. Some of the seniors, who were writing in traditional poetry and free verse, opposed this short form of poetry. They argued that it is degrading the value of the modern poetry. But many poets got motivated for writing mini poetry and lot of literature came in Telugu.

All these movements are going in Telugu and also English language through English newspapers in Andhra Pradesh. In post independence, English newspapers have played a prominent role in literature not only for English but also for Telugu.  Indian Express, The Hindu, Deccan Chronicle newspapers have dominant role among English readers of Andhra Pradesh. Some poets wrote in Telugu and English simultaneously. Many books have published on these subjects and movements. Some of the prominent Telugu works have been translated in English for the benefit and indeed, informative to the non-Telugu readers a quick understanding of broad literary trends and movements in poetry during the twentieth century in Andhra Pradesh.

Paryavarana Kavitodyamam in 21st century

Paryavarana Kavitodyamam is Telugu word and its English translation is Environment Poetry Movement. The basic idea of this movement is to propagate Environmental Awareness through creative forms of literature to not only learned people, but also to masses.

Rapid growth of population human requirements is not getting fulfilled. People spoiling environment and it is bringing many new problems and changes in living conditions. With these changes there are many changes in the environment. There is strong need to propagate about Environment protection that to through literary forms of communication through magazines and newspapers, that will give good results. Poems, stories, slogans, essays should be encouraged to write in local languages and also English to take the matter to grass root level.
http://[Jagruthi Kiran Foundation]netajiaward.tripod.com/  under the leadership of internationally known environmentalist and Telugu poet, scholar "Vidyavachaspati" Prof Dr N N Murthy has started Paryavarana Kavitodyamam (Environment Poetry Movement) and the movement is going on very strong in the minds of literary personalities and also going to the gross root level through various activities.

Harita Kavita (Green Poem)
To promote this concept Harita Kavita (Green Poem) an International Poems Competition has been announced through Malle Teega magazine. This announcement came in all most all newspapers in Andhra Pradesh in English and Telugu in the month of May 2008. More than 600 poets responded and they have written poems and sent to this competition. A selection jury under the Chairmanship of  "Vidyavachaspati" Prof Dr N N Murthy Crusader of this movement and others Dr Raama Chandramouli, a prominent poet, Dr Raavi Ranga Rao, crusader of mini-poetry movement, Dr Chennai, Literary Observer and Officer in Potti Sreeramulu Telugu University has been formed to select the poems. Selection process is clearly announced in the form of a flow chart with a well defined method of evaluation with 40% for subject, 35% for creativity and 25% for language. Winners have been selected, apart from their poems many poems have been selected and these are getting published in Malle Teega and other newspapers. An anthology of poems in Telugu is in the process of publication. These Telugu poems are getting translated and English volume is also getting ready for publication.

Selection process of poems for Harita Kavita International Poetry Competition in scientific method

Quality standards in selection of poems for Harita Kavita International Poetry Competition

Harita Sahiti (Green Literature)
Another competition Harita Sahiti (Green Literature) has also been announced to analyse, criticise and promote this green poetry. Several poets are writing articles, essays, reviews etc. on green poetry in Telugu magazines, newspapers. A volume of literary articles is in the process of publication. The entire idea it to bring awareness about Environment among people. This is a new literary trend coming up in Andhra Pradesh in Telugu language.

Harita Kata (Green Story)
To promote this concept Harita Kata (Green Story) a Story Competition has been announced through Kadhakeli magazine. This announcement came in the month of September 2009. More than 100 writers responded and they have written stories and sent to this competition. A selection jury under the Chairmanship of "Vidyavachaspati" Prof Dr N N Murthy Crusader of this movement and three others have been formed to select the stories. Selection process is under progress for selecting stories.

Messages from International Personalities
Several prominent personalities world over sent informative messages in support of this movement. These messages also published in Malle Teega in last 15 months time. Messages and supportive letters came in different languages of the world with an English translation. These are a big motivating factor for this great movement.

Paryavarana Kavitodyamam (Environment Poetry Movement) Logo
A special logo has been designed by a European artist for this movement indicating the concept of Environment and its protection.  The logo was released by Konijeti Rosaiah the then Hon’ble Minister for Finance, present Chief Minister, Govt of Andhra Pradesh. This special colour Logo has been given as Annexure 1.

Involvement of Top People
Many top personalities are involved in this movement. Dr Y. S. Rajasekhara Reddy Y. S. Rajasekhara Reddy, Chief Minister of Andhra Pradesh released special issue of Malle Teega magazine focusing Environment. He also released a sticker on "Save Water, Save Environment". K. V. P. Ramachandra Rao K. V. P. Ramachandra Rao, Advisor to Govt of AP, PV Ranga Rao, Former Education Minister, (Son of Former Prime Minister P V Narasimha Rao) Konda Lakshman Bapuji, Former Dy Speaker, Nadendla Bhaskara Rao Former Chief Minister and many other personalities involved in this movement and gave their support.

Television Interviews
Gemini TV gave full half an hour interview of this author under the programme "Guest Hour" about this movement and Environmental problems. ETV 2 gave coverage about this movement in Telugu Velugu programme. Teja, TV5 channels give short interviews in their news bulletins during the year 2008. City Cable, Vijayawada telecasted full interview of this author about Global Warming.

Radio Talks
AIR Vijayawada station broadcast several talks of Prof Dr N N Murthy, Crusader of this movement on various burning problems of Environment during year 2008–2009. These talks received tremendous response from the listeners of coastal Andhra Pradesh.

Rallies
Paryavarana Kavitodyamam (Environment Poetry Movement) is not only limiting to creation of literature, but also several other forms of communication. Rallies with literary slogans are organised to mobilise the masses from gross-root level. A rally with 40,000 people was organised on 15 August 2008 at Eluru. Another rally has been organised at Nagpur on the occasion of Earth Day in the year 2008.

Lectures 
Lectures have been delivered various colleges, schools, social organisations and professional bodies to bring awareness about Environment and green literature. Prominent among these K L College of Engineering, Vijayawada, Amara College of Engineering, Narasaraopet, The Institution of Engineers (India) Vijayawada Centre.

Discussion on National Forums

National Science Communication Congress
Ministry of Science & Technology, Govt of India organised 8th Science Communication Congress at Chennai during 11–13 December 2008. There was a special invited lecture in English on this Paryavarana Kavitodyamam (Environment Poetry Movement) during its deliberations of three-day congress. There was also a discussion on importance of green literature in India that to in 21st century. Scientists, journalists, writers, poets stressed that there is a strong need of green literature. The abstract of this lecture has been published in the proceedings of the congress.

Sahitya Academy National Seminar
Sahitya Academy has organised a seminar on Integration through Translation in Vijayawada on 2 January 2009. In this seminar there was a discussion on Paryavarana Kavitodyamam (Environment Poetry Movement) as a unique in all Indian languages and also English. Many poets, writers came from all over India felt that English literature coming up through this movement will be highly useful to readers of other languages. This green literature is going to be a remarkable literary contribution for not only Indian English literature, but also for all Indian languages for the generations to come.

UGC National Seminar at Katol, Nagpur
University Grants Commission organised a National Seminar on Post Colonial English Literature in India in Feb 2009 at Nabira Mahavidyalay, Katol, near Nagpur. A paper on this Paryavarana Kavitodyamam (Environment Poetry Movement) has been presented by this author in this seminar and it was well received by the participants.

International Symposium at Tirupati
Department of Zoology, Sri Venkateswara University, Tirupati in collaboration with
United States Environmental Protection Agency, RTP, NC, USA, Savannah State University, Savannah, Georgia, USA organised an International Symposium on Environmental Pollution, Ecology & Human Health, 25–27 July 2009. Keynote Lecture was given by this author on "Environment Awareness through Creative Forms of Literature" With reference to Paryavarana Kavitodyamam in Andhra Preadesh. This was appreciated by every one.

Special Lecture by Former UN Under-Secretary General
A special lecture has been organised by Jagruthi Kiran Foundation at Nagpur on Environment in Feb 2009. This was delivered by Dr Shashi Tharoor, Former UN Under Secretary General and Former Minister for External Affairs, Govt of India. This was well attended by many dignitaries of Nagpur. Dr Seshi Tharoor appreciated the Paryavarana Kavitodyamam (Environment Poetry Movement) and its initiative taken by Jagruthi Kiran Foundation.

Training to Fishermen
A half-day training session was organised by Jagruthi Kiran Foundation and Dr Ram Centre of Jawahar Bharathi College, Kavali at a coastal village near Kavali about how to save sea. Fishermen were trained on how to save sea from plastics and modern industrial wastes, so that they can get good fish. More than 50 fishermen participated in this and the training was very fruitful. This was organised in December 2008.

Activities on Youtube
Many videos are available on Youtube giving activities of this movement time to time and these videos good information about the movement.

Conclusion
There is a strong need of green literature in 21st century. Not only in Andhra Pradesh but also such movements like Paryavarana Kavitodyamam (Environment Poetry Movement) are needed in all Indian languages. Literature produced on this subject in English in 21st century will be useful to all languages of India and it will give a wonderful society.

References

 Environmental management by Prof Dr N N Murthy
 20th Century Telugu Poetry by Velcheru Narayana Rao
 Mini Kavita 10 volumes by Ravi Ranga Rao
 Essays on Mini Kavita by Ravi Ranga Rao
 Mini poems – Many Ideas by Ravi Ranga Rao
 Magazines, newspapers of Andhra Pradesh

External links
 Jalleda.com
 N N Murthy speaks on Paryavarana Kavitodyamam-Citi Cable News, Vijayawada
 N N Murthy speaks on World Poetry Scenario at Hyderabad 
 A Souvenir Dedicated to Nature and Environment
 హరిత-కవిత-2009
 N N Murthy speaks on Paryavarana Kavitodyamam at MHRD National Seminar, Delhi
 Harita Kata (ParyavaranaKavitodyamam) at Rajahmundry
 Candle Light March for Paryavarana Kavitodyamam
 Paryavarana Kavitodyamam at Hyderabad
 Kolakaluri Enoch admire N N Murthy & Paryavarana Kavitodyamam at Hyderabad
 N N Murthy interview on Harita Kata in Nederlands by DW Radio dated 19 August 2009
 N N Murthy talks on Paryavarana Kavitodyamam at Vijayawada
 N N Murthy speaks on Paryavarana Kavitodyamam at Gemini TV Interview (Part-7)

Indian literature
Telugu language
Telugu-language literature
Telugu poetry
Literary movements